James Wilson Aiken (May 26, 1899 – October 31, 1961) was an American football player and coach of football and basketball.  He served as the head football coach at the University of Akron (1936–1938), the University of Nevada (1939–1946), and the University of Oregon (1947–1950), compiling a career college football record of 78–53–5.  Aiken was also the head basketball coach at Nevada for a season in 1944–45, tallying a mark of 8–9.

Early years
The son of a farmer, Aiken was born near Wheeling, West Virginia, and later moved to nearby Tiltonsville, Ohio. He attended Martins Ferry High School and was a standout athlete.

Following the First World War, Aiken enrolled at Washington & Jefferson College in Washington, Pennsylvania, and earned four letters in football as an end for the Presidents. He was a senior on the 1921 team under head coach Greasy Neale which played California to a scoreless tie in the Rose Bowl.

High school coach
After graduation from college in 1922, Aiken was a successful high school football coach in Pennsylvania and Ohio, at Findlay High School in Findlay, Ohio, where he won a state championship in 1925, Scott in Toledo (1926–1931), and McKinley in Canton (1932–1935).

College coach
From 1936 to 1938 at Akron, Aiken's teams posted a 19–7–1 record, which is the best mark in school history. From 1939 to 1946, at Nevada in Reno, he posted a 38–26–3 record. He moved to Oregon in 1947, and compiled a 21–20 record. In his first year in Eugene, he led the Ducks to a 7–3 record, followed by an undefeated conference record in 1948 and an appearance in the Cotton Bowl. In those first two seasons, the team was led on the field by quarterback Norm Van Brocklin, a future member of the Pro Football Hall of Fame. Halfback John McKay, future head coach at USC and the expansion Tampa Bay Buccaneers, transferred from Purdue and was a key member of the 1948 and 1949 teams.

After coaching
After four seasons in Eugene, Aiken resigned as head coach at Oregon in June 1951, and entered the lumber business in Roseburg. Aiken had several mild heart attacks in the late 1950s and was later the athletic director at Roseburg High School. After giving a speech at a sports dinner in 1961 in Medford, he suffered a heart attack and died at age 62.

Head coaching record

College football

Notes

References

External links
 

1899 births
1961 deaths
Akron Zips football coaches
American football ends
Nevada Wolf Pack athletic directors
Nevada Wolf Pack football coaches
Nevada Wolf Pack men's basketball coaches
Oregon Ducks football coaches
Washington & Jefferson Presidents football players
High school football coaches in Ohio
High school football coaches in Pennsylvania
People from Jefferson County, Ohio
People from Martins Ferry, Ohio
Sportspeople from Wheeling, West Virginia
Basketball coaches from Ohio
Coaches of American football from Ohio
Players of American football from Ohio